

This article lists the prime ministers of the Hyderabad State.

In 1919, Asaf Jah VII ordered the formation of the Executive Council of Hyderabad, presided by Sir Sayyid Ali Imam, and with eight other members, each in charge of one or more departments. The President of the Executive Council would also be the Prime Minister of Hyderabad. The position was abolished in 1948 when Indian Army invaded the Hyderabad State and merged it with the Union of India.

List of officeholders

See also
 List of Diwans of Mysore
 List of Diwans of Travancore

References

External links
 Hyderabad, Princely States of India, WorldStatesmen.org

Hyderabad State
India history-related lists
1724 establishments in India
Hyderabad, India-related lists
British India-related lists
Hyderabad State